Obtusifolium is a genus of liverworts belonging to the family Cephaloziellaceae.

The species of this genus are found in Europe and Russia.

Species:
 Obtusifolium obtusum (Lindb.) S.W.Arnell

References

Jungermanniales
Jungermanniales genera